A list of artillery catalogues types of weapons found in batteries of national armed forces' artillery units.

Some weapons used by the infantry units, known as infantry support weapons, are often misidentified as artillery weapons because of their use and performance characteristics, sometimes known colloquially as the "infantryman's artillery" which has been particularly applied to mortars.

The distinguishing feature of infantry support weapons from artillery weapons is in the unit that provides the personnel for the weapon crew.

This list does not differentiate between guns and cannons, although some designations use one word or the other. The word "cannon" is of Latin origin, borrowed into the English language from the French, while "gun" appears to be of German language origin and is found in earlier use in England. There is almost universal use of gunner in the English language to refer to artillery personnel, and not the French term cannonier. Some English speaking armies do use the originally French term bombardier as a rank in artillery units.

See also list of artillery by name and list of artillery by country.

Recoilless guns

Recoilless guns 
A recoilless gun or recoilless rifle (RCL) is a lightweight weapon that fires a heavier projectile than would be practical to fire from a recoiling weapon of comparable size. Technically, only devices that use a rifled barrel are recoilless rifles. Smoothbore variants are recoilless guns. This distinction is often lost, and both are often called recoilless rifles.

Normally used for anti-tank roles, the first effective system of this kind was developed during World War II to provide infantry with light, cheap and easily deployable weapon that does not require extensive training in gunnery. The near complete lack of recoil allows some versions to be shoulder-fired, but the majority are mounted on light tripods and are intended to be easily carried by a soldier.

Self-propelled recoilless guns 
Self-propelled recoilless guns are vehicles designed to carry recoilless guns. 
Only a few such designs have been successful, many mounting multiple rifles.

Anti-aircraft guns

Towed and static anti-aircraft guns

Self-propelled anti-aircraft guns 

Anti-aircraft guns are weapons designed to attack aircraft. Such weapons commonly have a high rate of fire and are able to fire shells designed to damage aircraft. They also are capable of firing at high angles, but are also usually able to hit ground targets as well in a direct-fire role.

Anti-tank guns

Towed anti-tank guns

Self-propelled anti-tank guns 

Anti-tank guns are typically high-velocity guns designed to fire anti-tank shells. They are usually designed to be easily transported and concealed to maximize responsiveness and surprise.

Assault guns 

Assault guns are guns mounted in armored vehicles designed to provide direct fire support for infantry and armored forces. Typically, the gun is mounted in the hull and the front of the vehicle most heavily armored.

Autocannons 

Autocannons are like machine guns but their calibers are greater than 20mm.

Vehicle guns

Aircraft artillery 

Aircraft artillery has been used since the first world war.

Tank guns 

Tank guns are high-velocity guns designed to be fitted into the turret of a tank. They share many design features with anti-tank guns and in many cases are directly related to anti-tank gun designs. The primary objective of most tank guns is to be able to destroy other tanks, but other tasks such as fire support and anti-personnel missions often are required.

Naval artillery 

Naval guns are manufactured based on the same principles as the land based artillery ordnance, but differ significantly in system design and use. Never referred to as "artillery" it is however often called upon to provide naval artillery fire support to the land forces operation in the coastal region within their range.

Railway artillery 

Railway artillery involved large guns and howitzers mounted and transported on specially-constructed railway cars.

Mortars

Infantry mortars 

The List of infantry mortars catalogues weapons which are issued to infantry units to provide close range, rapid response, indirect fire capability of an infantry unit in tactical combat. In this sense the mortar has been called "infantryman's artillery", and represents a flexible logistic solution to satisfying unexpected need for delivery of firepower, particularly for the light infantry. In general infantry mortars are defined by what a team of infantrymen, sometimes known as mortarmen, can transport unaided by significant vehicle support. Because of this intrinsic restriction mandated by weight, mortars are only considered "infantry" to a caliber of 120mm. These larger weapons usually require wheeled assemblies to allow their towing either by hand or by light tactical vehicles.

Heavy mortars 

Heavy mortars are large-caliber mortars designed to fire a relatively heavy shell on a high angle trajectory. Such weapons have a relatively short range, but are usually less complex than similar caliber field artillery.

This category includes the "Trench Mortars" of World War I which were all too heavy and cumbersome, and hence lacked the mobility, to be classed as infantry mortars.

Field artillery

Muzzle-loading guns

Infantry guns

Self-propelled infantry guns 

Infantry guns are designed to provide direct organic support for infantry forces. They fire a range of shells, primarily in a direct-fire mode. Most are lightweight and capable of being manhandled for limited mobility to accompany infantry.

Mountain artillery 

Mountain artillery, which includes pack howitzers, mountain howitzers and mountain guns, is designed to accompany mountain infantry forces. Usually lightweight and designed to be broken down to be portable by pack animals or even soldiers, they often are in limited calibers with low muzzle energy. Correspondingly, range and anti-armor capabilities are limited. However, they can deliver useful firepower in locations that may be inaccessible to heavier support forces.

Field guns

Self-propelled field guns 

Field guns are one of two primary types of field artillery. Guns fire a heavy shell on a relatively level trajectory from a longer barrel, allowing for very high muzzle velocity and good range performance. Guns are most adequate for providing long range fire support and counter-battery fire.

Howitzers

Self-propelled howitzers 

Howitzers are one of two primary types of field artillery. Howitzers fire a heavy shell in a high trajectory from a relatively short barrel. Range is limited but howitzers are slightly more mobile than similarly sized field guns.

Siege artillery 

Siege artillery are heavy guns and other bombardment devices designed to bombard fortifications, cities, and other fixed targets. They are capable of firing heavy shells but require enormous transport and logistical support to operate. They lack mobility and thus are rarely useful in more mobile warfare situations.

Rocket artillery

Coastal artillery

See also 
 List of artillery by country
 List of World War II artillery
 List of naval guns
 List of weapons
 List of tank main guns
 List of Grenade Launchers
 List of recoilless rifles
Glossary of British ordnance terms

Citations and notes

References
 Chamberlain, Peter, and Hilary L. Doyle. Thomas L. Jentz (Technical Editor), Encyclopedia of German Tanks of World War Two: A Complete Illustrated Directory of German Battle Tanks, Armoured Cars, Self-propelled Guns, and Semi-tracked Vehicles, 1933–1945, London: Arms and Armour Press, 1978 (revised edition 2004).
 Margiotta, Franklin D., Brassey's Encyclopedia of Land Forces and Warfare, Brassey's, 1997
 Johnson, Samuel, A Dictionary of the English Language: In which the Words are Deduced from Their Originals, and Illustrated in Their Different Significations, by Examples from the Best Writers, to which are Prefixed a History of the Language, and an English Grammar, v. 1, A-D, Printed for Longman, Hurst, Rees, and Orme, 1805
 Zaloga, Steven J., James Grandsen (1984). Soviet Tanks and Combat Vehicles of World War Two, London: Arms and Armour Press. .

Artillery by type
Type

tr:Obüsler listesi